James Aubrey Parker (January 8, 1937 – September 16, 2022) was a United States district judge of the United States District Court for the District of New Mexico.

Education and career
Born in Houston, Texas, Parker received a Bachelor of Arts degree from Rice University in 1959 and a Bachelor of Laws from the University of Texas School of Law in 1962. He was in private practice in Albuquerque, New Mexico, from 1962 to 1987.

Federal judicial service
On July 10, 1987, Parker was nominated by President Ronald Reagan to a seat on the United States District Court for the District of New Mexico vacated by Judge Howard C. Bratton. Parker was confirmed by the United States Senate on November 5, 1987, and received his commission on November 6, 1987. He served as Chief Judge from 2000 to 2003, assuming senior status on September 1, 2003. 

Parker died on September 16, 2022, at the age of 85.

References

Sources
 

1937 births
2022 deaths
20th-century American judges
21st-century American judges
Judges of the United States District Court for the District of New Mexico
Lawyers from Houston
Rice University alumni
United States district court judges appointed by Ronald Reagan
University of Texas School of Law alumni